Marseniopsis is a genus of small slug-like sea snails, marine gastropod molluscs in the subfamily Velutininae within the family Velutinidae.

Species
 Marseniopsis antarctica Vayssière, 1906
 Marseniopsis conica (E. A. Smith, 1902)
 Marseniopsis hexalateratus Egorova, 2007
 Marseniopsis innominatus Iredale, 1936
 Marseniopsis mollis (E. A. Smith, 1902)
 Marseniopsis pacifica Bergh, 1886
 Marseniopsis soliditesta Numanami, 1996
 Marseniopsis spherica Numanami, 1996
 Marseniopsis syowaensis Numanami & Okutani, 1991
Taxa inquirenda
 Marseniopsis charcoti Vayssière, 1917 
 Marseniopsis murrayi Bergh, 1886

References

(in) Expédition Antarctique Francaise (1903-1905) commandée par le Dr Jean Charcot. Documents Scientifiques. Sciences Naturelles, p. p. 34-51, 4 pls

External links
 Bergh [L.S. R. (1886). Report on the Marseniadae collected by H.M.S. Challenger during the years 1873-1876. Report on the Scientific Results of the Voyage of H.M.S. Challenger during the years 1873–76. Zoology. 15 (part 41):1-24, pl. 1]
 ndex to Organism Names (ION)

Velutinidae